Ranuccio Farnese (11 August 1530 – 29 October 1565) was an Italian prelate of the Farnese family , who was Cardinal of Santa Lucia in Selci from 1545 to his death in 1565.  Son of Pier Luigi Farnese, the illegitimate son of Pope Paul III, Farnese was created Cardinal at the age of 15 by his grandfather the pope: he was nicknamed the cardinalino ("little cardinal") for his young age.

Biography
Ranuccio Farnese was born in Valentano. As a 12-year-old, he was made prior of the Knights of Malta's important property San Giovanni dei Forlani in Venice.  He was also administrator of the archdiocese of Naples, and was granted several bishoprics; Farnese was twice the titular Latin Patriarch of Constantinople, from 1546-1550 and 1554?-1565. Farnese was patron to Federico Commandino, an important translator of ancient Greek mathematical works.

Farnese's brother, Ottavio Farnese, was Duke of Parma, and his brother Alessandro Farnese was also a cardinal

He is buried in the Archbasilica of St. John Lateran in Rome.

References
https://web.archive.org/web/20041214144605/http://www.exseminarians.com/rome/Churches/johnlateran.htm (retrieved January 23, 2005)

https://web.archive.org/web/20050208010329/http://www.nga.gov/collection/gallery/gg23/gg23-41320.0.html (retrieved January 23, 2005)

External links
Ranuccio Farnese's tomb
Farnese family tree  from about 1390 to 1766.

1530 births
1565 deaths
People from the Province of Viterbo
Ranuccio Cardinale
16th-century Italian cardinals
Italian knights
Cardinal-bishops of Sabina
Cardinal-nephews
Major Penitentiaries of the Apostolic Penitentiary
Latin Patriarchs of Constantinople
Burials at the Archbasilica of Saint John Lateran
Sons of monarchs